Nicholas Pierini (born 6 August 1998) is an Italian footballer who plays as a forward for  club Venezia.

Club career

Sassuolo 
On 29 October 2017, Pierini made his professional debut in Serie A for Sassuolo as a substitute replacing Luca Mazzitelli in the 71st minute of a 3–1 away defeat against Napoli. On 20 December he played his first match as a starter in Coppa Italia, a 2–1 away defeat against Atalanta in the round of 16, he was replaced by Diego Falcinelli in the 54th minute.

Loan to Spezia 
On 10 July 2018, Pierini was signed by Serie B side Spezia on a season-long loan deal. On 4 August he made his debut for Spezia and he scored his first professional goal in the 66th minute of a 2–1 home win over Sambenedettese in the second round of Coppa Italia, he was replaced by Luca Vignali after 85 minutes. Three weeks later, on 25 August, he made his Serie B debut for Spezia as a substitute replacing Emmanuel Gyasi in the 64th minute of a 1–0 away defeat against Venezia. One week later, on 1 September, Pierini scored twice in a 3–2 home win over Brescia. On 27 October he played his first entire match for the team, a 0–0 away draw against Padova. Pierini ended his season-long loan with 27 appearances and 6 goals.

Loan to Cosenza 
On 9 August 2019, Pierini was loaned to Serie B side Cosenza on season-long loan deal. On 11 August he made his debut for the club in a 1–0 away defeat against Monopoli in the second round of Coppa Italia, he played the entire match. On 24 August he made his league debut for Cosenza in a 0–0 away draw against Crotone, he was replaced Riccardo Moreo after 74 minutes. One week later he played his first entire match for Cosenza, a 1–0 home defeat against Salernitana. On 24 September, Pierini scored his first goal for Cosenza, as a substitute, in the 94th minute of a 1–1 home draw against Livorno. On 10 November he scored twice in a 2–2 away draw against Trapani. Pierini ended his loan to Cosenza with 21 appearances, 3 goals and 1 assist.

Loan to Ascoli and Modena 
On 5 October 2020, Pierini joined Serie B club Ascoli on loan for the 2020-21 season. On 17 October he made his debut for the club, as a starter in a 1–0 away defeat against Frosinone, he played the entire match. However in January 2021 his loan was interrupted and he returned to Sassuolo leaving Ascoli with 12 appearances, only 5 of them as a starter and one assist.

On 1 February 2021, he moved on a new loan to Serie C club Modena. On the next day, Pierini made his debut for his new club as a substitute replacing Sodinha in the 78th minute of a 1–1 home draw against Triestina. On 21 March he played his first match as a starter for Modena in a 1–0 home win over Cesena, he was replaced by Enrico Bearzotti in the 82nd minute. On 18 April he scored his first goal for the club in the 53rd minute of a 3–0 home win over Padova. One week later, on 25 April, he scored his second goal in the 75th minute of a 3–0 home win over Legnago. Pierini ended his 6-months loan to Modena 12 appearances, 3 goals and 3 assists, he also helped the club to reach the play-offs, but Modena was elimininated 2–1 on aggregate against AlbinoLeffe in the round of 16.

Cesena
On 31 August 2021, he signed a four-year contract with Cesena.

Venezia
On 13 July 2022, Pierini moved to Venezia on a four-year contract.

Personal life 
He is a son of former Italy international footballer and current coach Alessandro Pierini.

Career statistics

Club

Honours

Club 
Sassuolo Primavera
 Torneo di Viareggio: 2017

References

External links 
 

1998 births
Living people
Sportspeople from Parma
Italian footballers
Association football forwards
Serie A players
Serie B players
Serie C players
U.S. Sassuolo Calcio players
Spezia Calcio players
Cosenza Calcio players
Ascoli Calcio 1898 F.C. players
Modena F.C. players
Cesena F.C. players
Venezia F.C. players
Italy youth international footballers
Footballers from Emilia-Romagna